Lindsey Shockley is an American comedy writer, producer and improviser best known for her work on HBO's Hello Ladies and ABC's Blackish.  Shockley recently served as Executive Producer on Season 5 of ABC's Blackish.

Early life
Shockley was born in Cincinnati, Ohio and grew up in Chapel Hill, North Carolina, the daughter of Linda and William Shockley.  She helped found her high school's improv comedy team East Chapel Hill High's "Randomax".

In 2003, Shockley graduated summa cum laude from the University of Pennsylvania with a BA in Communications.  In 2007, Shockley earned an MFA from University of Southern California's School of Cinematic Arts in Film Production. While at USC, her short film she wrote and directed, The Truth About Faces, garnered attention for being shot entirely in one continuous take. Once moving to Los Angeles, Shockley took classes and studied improv comedy at the Upright Citizens Brigade and performed at the Improv Comedy Lab with her improv team, "The Cabinet".

Career
In 2010, Shockley began her TV writing career on NBC's Perfect Couples. She went on to write for ABC's Work It, Fox's Ben and Kate, HBO's Hello Ladies, ABC's Trophy Wife, and USA's Benched. In 2014, she began writing on ABC's Blackish where she currently serves as an Executive Producer on the show's sixth season.
In 2014, Shockley inked her first overall deal with ABC Studios to develop new projects and serve as a writer/producer on Blackish. The deal stemmed from her work on ABC Studios' shows Hello Ladies, Trophy Wife, and Benched.
In 2017, Shockley's original pilot idea Unit Zero  was picked up by ABC Studios. Shockley wrote the script as well as executive produced the pilot alongside Kenya Barris.

Personal life
In 2012, Shockley married drama writer Steven Edell. The two met while in graduate school at USC's School of Cinematic Arts. In 2014, they welcomed their first child.

Filmography

Awards

References

External links

Lindsey Shockley on Variety
Lindsey Shockley on Twitter
The Truth About Faces

Year of birth missing (living people)
Living people
Annenberg School for Communication at the University of Pennsylvania alumni
USC School of Cinematic Arts alumni
Writers from Cincinnati
People from Chapel Hill, North Carolina
American comedy writers